Eduardo Marques de Castro Silva (born 28 January 1992 in Lourosa (Santa Maria da Feira)), commonly known as Edú, is a Portuguese professional footballer who plays as an attacking midfielder.

References

External links

1992 births
Living people
Portuguese footballers
Association football midfielders
Liga Portugal 2 players
Segunda Divisão players
C.F. União de Lamas players
Boavista F.C. players
Padroense F.C. players
FC Porto B players
C.D. Trofense players
S.C. Beira-Mar players
F.C. Penafiel players
Lusitânia F.C. players
Cypriot First Division players
AEL Limassol players
Portugal youth international footballers
Portugal under-21 international footballers
Portuguese expatriate footballers
Expatriate footballers in Cyprus
Portuguese expatriate sportspeople in Cyprus